is a Japanese manga series written and illustrated by Hatsuharu. It has been serialized in Kodansha's shōjo manga magazine Bessatsu Friend since December 2018, with its chapters collected into seven tankōbon volumes as of January 2022. An anime television series adaptation is set to premiere in 2023.

Media

Manga
Written and illustrated by Hatsuharu, A Girl & Her Guard Dog began serialization in Kodansha's Bessatsu Friend magazine on December 13, 2018. The first tankōbon volume was released on April 12, 2019. As of October 2022, eight volumes have been released.

In November 2020, Kodansha USA announced that they licensed the series for an English digital release.

Volume list

Anime
An anime television series adaptation was announced on October 10, 2022. It is set to premiere in 2023.

References

Further reading

External links
  
  
 

2023 anime television series debuts
Anime series based on manga
Kodansha manga
Romantic comedy anime and manga
School life in anime and manga
Shōjo manga
Upcoming anime television series
Yakuza in anime and manga